Crotalus helleri, known as the Southern Pacific rattlesnake, black diamond rattlesnake, and by other names, is a pit viper subspecies found in southwestern California and south into Baja California, Mexico, that is known for its regional variety of dangerous venom types.

Etymology
The specific name, helleri, is in honor of American zoologist Edmund Heller.

Description

Adults are 24–55 inches (61–139 cm) in length.

The color pattern consists of a pale brown, gray-brown, or yellowish brown ground color overlaid with a series of large, dark brown dorsal blotches that may or may not have pale centers. The blotches are more diamond shaped, as opposed to those of C. o. oreganus that are more hexagonal, and are bordered by light scales. The tail rings are not clearly defined. In juveniles, the end of the tail is bright orange, but this turns to brown as the snakes mature. In adults, the base of the tail and the first segment of the rattle are brown. The postocular stripe is moderately to very clearly defined. In juveniles, this stripe is bordered above by a pale stripe, but as the snakes mature this turns to drab yellow or brown. A conspicuous pale crossbar is sometimes present across the supraoculars, after which the head is a uniform dark color. In some older snakes the head is mostly dark with almost no trace of the supraorbital crossbar, or none at all.

Common names
Common names include Southern Pacific rattlesnake, black diamond rattlesnake, black (diamond) rattler, gray diamond-back, mountain rattler, Pacific rattler, and San Diegan rattler.

Venom varieties
Some populations of Crotalus helleri have a neurotoxic venom that is very similar to the extremely dangerous Mojave rattlesnake (the "Mojave Green") toxin in the way it attacks the nervous system. Other populations can have hemotoxic and myotoxic venom that is more typical among rattlesnakes and though less dangerous, can also can give a fatal bite.
Thus, depending on where the bite was sustained, envenomation from this snake can require a much higher dose of Crotalidae polyvalent immune fab ("Crofab"), an antivenom used to treat the bite of North American pit vipers, than the venoms of other rattlesnakes, including the venom of Crotalus helleri specimens of different provenance. In a survey of various populations of Crotalus in California, every sampled specimen with disabling neurotoxic venom had originated near Idyllwild, California, in the San Jacinto Mountains. Scientists considered the intraspecific variety of venom types "medically significant", while hypothesizing that evolutionary pressures, driven by regional habitat differences and the associated challenges of hunting prey in each, could have been behind the variation of venom types in Crotalus helleri, and that cross-breeding with the Mojave rattlesnake, which is geographically separated from neurotoxic Crotalus populations, was unlikely.

Geographic range

This snake is found in the United States in southern California, and in Mexico in northern Baja California, west of the desert. In the north it is found from the counties of San Luis Obispo and Kern, and south through the counties of Santa Barbara, Ventura, Los Angeles (including Santa Catalina Island and the foothills.), southwestern San Bernardino, Orange, western Riverside, San Diego and extreme western Imperial. From there its range extends south through Baja California to lat. 28° 30' North. According to Klauber (1956), the type locality is "San Jose, Lower California" [San José, lat. 31° N, Baja California (state), Mexico].

References

Further reading

Ashton KG, de Queiroz A (2001). "Molecular systematics of the western rattlesnake, Crotalus viridis (Viperidae), with comments on the utility of the d-loop in phylogenetic studies of snakes". Molecular Phylogenetics and Evolution 21 (2): 176–189. PDF at CNAH. Accessed 12 December 2007.
Hubbs B, O'Connor B (2012). A Guide to the Rattlesnakes and other Venomous Serpents of the United States. Tempe, Arizona: Tricolor Books 129 pp. . (Crotalus oreganus helleri, pp. 25–27).
Meek SE (1905). "An Annotated list of a Collection of Reptiles from Southern California and Northern Lower California". Field Columbian Museum Publication 104. Fieldiana Zoology 7 (1): 1–19. ("Crotalus helleri sp. nov.", pp. 17–18 & Plate II).

External links

helleri
Reptiles of Mexico
Reptiles of the United States
Fauna of California
Fauna of the Baja California Peninsula
Fauna of the Western United States
Fauna of the California chaparral and woodlands
Natural history of the Peninsular Ranges
Natural history of the Transverse Ranges
Animals described in 1905